Kamangar (Persian: کمانگ) is an Iranian surname that may refer to the following notable people:
Farzad Kamangar (c.1978–2010), Iranian Kurdish teacher
Salar Kamangar (born 1977), Iranian-American senior executive at Google 
Sedigh Kamangar (1946–1989), Iranian Kurdish politician
Tara Kamangar, American classical pianist and composer

Persian-language surnames